Interstate 35 Community School District is a rural public school district headquartered in Truro, Iowa.

Schools
The district has a single campus in Truro. Its levels are preschool, elementary, and secondary. The high school portion was built in 1981, and by fall 2002 a K-8 addition was scheduled to open.

Previously the preschool and high school were in Truro, the elementary school was in St. Charles, and the middle school was in New Virginia. All elementary and middle school students were scheduled to move to the Truro K-8 facility upon its opening.

Interstate 35 High School

Athletics
The Roadrunners compete in the West Central Activities Conference in the following sports:
Cross Country
Volleyball
Football
Basketball
Wrestling
Track and Field
Golf 
Baseball
Softball

See also
List of school districts in Iowa
List of high schools in Iowa

References

External links
 Interstate 35 Community School District
 Interstate 35 Community School District at Edline
 

School districts in Iowa
Education in Clarke County, Iowa
Education in Madison County, Iowa
Education in Warren County, Iowa